Shenandoah is an unincorporated area and census-designated place (CDP) in East Baton Rouge Parish, Louisiana, United States. It is part of the Baton Rouge Metropolitan Statistical Area. The population was 18,399 at the 2010 census, up from 17,070 in 2000. Shenandoah consists of a number of residential subdivisions, including Shenandoah Estates, Shenandoah Park, White Oak Landing, White Oak Estates, The Woods and The Lake at White Oak.

It is in the proposed City of St. George.

Geography
Shenandoah is located in southeastern East Baton Rouge Parish at  (30.401391, -91.004412). It is bordered to the west by Baton Rouge and to the south by Old Jefferson. Louisiana Highway 73, Old Jefferson Highway, touches the southwest corner of Shenandoah and leads northwest  to downtown Baton Rouge.

Demographics

As of the 2020 United States census, there were 19,292 people, 7,346 households, and 5,628 families residing in the CDP.

As of the census of 2000, there were 17,070 people, 5,911 households, and 4,900 families residing in the CDP. The racial makeup of the CDP was 92.13% White, 4.42% African American, 0.24% Native American, 2.08% Asian, 0.01% Pacific Islander, 0.39% from other races, and 0.73% from two or more races. Hispanic or Latino of any race were 1.62% of the population.

There were 5,911 households, out of which 46.7% had children under the age of 18 living with them, 73.1% were married couples living together, 7.1% had a female householder with no husband present, and 17.1% were non-families. 13.5% of all households were made up of individuals, and 2.5% had someone living alone who was 65 years of age or older. The average household size was 2.89 and the average family size was 3.21.

In the CDP, the population was spread out, with 29.8% under the age of 18, 7.3% from 18 to 24, 30.6% from 25 to 44, 27.3% from 45 to 64, and 5.0% who were 65 years of age or older. The median age was 36 years. For every 100 females, there were 98.4 males. For every 100 females age 18 and over, there were 95.4 males.

The median income for a household in the CDP was $73,536, and the median income for a family was $79,302. Males had a median income of $58,938 versus $31,339 for females. The per capita income for the CDP was $29,722. About 1.2% of families and 2.2% of the population were below the poverty line, including 2.8% of those under age 18 and 0.1% of those age 65 or over.

Education
East Baton Rouge Parish Public Schools serves Shenandoah. Shenandoah Elementary School in Shenandoah serves a large portion of the CDP. A portion in the west is zoned to Parkview Elementary School, and a portion in the north is served by Wedgewood Elementary. Most of the community is zoned to Woodlawn Middle School in Shenandoah while a portion is zoned to Southeast Middle School in Baton Rouge. Almost all of Shenandoah is zoned to Woodlawn High School in Old Jefferson, while a small section is zoned to Tara High School in Baton Rouge.

St. Michael the Archangel High School, a private Catholic high school, is located in Shenandoah.

East Baton Rouge Parish Library operates the Jones Creek Regional Branch Library in the Shenandoah CDP. The  facility, designed by Raymond Post Architects, was the first parish library financed by property taxes. It opened in April 1990.

References

External links
 Woodlawn Middle School
 Shenandoah Elementary School

Census-designated places in Louisiana
Census-designated places in East Baton Rouge Parish, Louisiana
Baton Rouge metropolitan area